Interstate 74 (I-74) is  an Interstate Highway in the Midwestern and Southeastern United States. Its western end is at an interchange with I-80 in Davenport, Iowa (Quad Cities); the eastern end of its Midwest segment is at an interchange with I-75 in Cincinnati, Ohio. The major cities that I-74 connects to include Davenport, Iowa; Peoria, Illinois; Bloomington, Illinois; Champaign, Illinois; Indianapolis, Indiana; and Cincinnati, Ohio. I-74 also exists as several disconnected sections of highways in North Carolina.

Route description

|-
|IA ||
|-
|IL ||
|-
|IN ||
|-
|OH ||
|-
|WV || ||
|-
|VA || ||
|-
|NC ||
|-
|SC || ||
|-
|Total ||
|}

Iowa

In the state of Iowa, I-74 runs south from I-80 for  before crossing into Illinois on the I-74 Bridge. North of the Mississippi River, I-74 bisects Bettendorf and Davenport.

Illinois

In the state of Illinois, I-74 runs south from Moline to Galesburg; from this point, it runs southeast through Peoria to the Bloomington–Normal area and I-55. I-74 continues southeasterly to the Champaign–Urbana metropolitan area, intersecting I-57. The Interstate then runs east past Danville at the Illinois–Indiana state line. U.S. Route 150 (US 150) parallels I-74 in Illinois for its entire length, save the last few miles on the eastern end (in Danville, when US 150 turns south on Illinois Route 1 (IL 1)), where it parallels US 136.

Indiana

In the state of Indiana, I-74 runs east from the Illinois state line to the Crawfordsville area before turning southeasterly. It then runs around the city center of Indianapolis along I-465. Once I-74 reaches the southeast side of Indianapolis, it diverges from I-465 and continues to the southeast. It then enters Ohio at Harrison.

Ohio

In the state of Ohio, I-74 runs southeast from the Indiana border to the western segment's current eastern terminus at I-75 just north of Downtown Cincinnati. It is also signed with US 52 for its entire length. While planned to continue through West Virginia and Virginia to the I-74 section in North Carolina, the route remains unsigned or unbuilt past Cincinnati. At this point, I-74 would follow US 52 or more likely follow State Route 32 (SR 32), east from Cincinnati.

North Carolina

In the state of North Carolina, I-74 exists in several segments, starting with a concurrency with I-77 at the Virginia border. This includes the most western portion from I-77 to US 52 just south of Mount Airy, a segment first opened to traffic as a bypass of High Point then extended west to I-40 east of Winston-Salem and east to I-73 near Randleman, then another along the southern segment of I–73 and US 220 from just north of Asheboro to south of Ellerbe, and finally a more eastern segment that runs from Laurinburg to an end at NC 41 near Lumberton. The latest segment to be signed, from I-40 to High Point, occurred after the federal government approved signing this section as I-74 in mid-2013, despite the highway not being up to current Interstate Highway standards. It was uncertain why the Federal Highway Administration (FHWA) made an exception, but this might have been the result of a misinterpretation when a state highway administrator asked for Interstate designation for another section and "Future Interstate" for the section already completed that did not meet standards.

Future
Long-range plans call for I-74 to continue east and south of Cincinnati to North Carolina using SR 32 from Cincinnati to Piketon, Ohio, and then the proposed I-73 from Portsmouth, Ohio, through West Virginia (along current US 52) to I-77. It would then follow I-77 through Virginia into North Carolina, where I-74 splits from I-77 near the Virginia state line and runs eastward to northwest US 52, which it will eventually follow to Winston-Salem, then through High Point to I-73. I-73 and I-74 overlap to Rockingham.

In 1996, the American Association of State Highway and Transportation Officials (AASHTO) approved the signing of highways as I-74 along its proposed path east (south) of I-81 in Wytheville, Virginia, where those highways meet Interstate Highway standards. North Carolina started putting up I-74 signs along its roadways in 1997. , I-74 is proposed to follow the path of I-77 through the state of Virginia but remains unsigned from the West Virginia border to the North Carolina border.

Ohio 
The 1991 plan to build I-73 soon included an extension of I-74 from where it ended in Hamilton County to I-73 at Portsmouth, Ohio, possibly along SR 32.

In November 1991, Congress passed the $151-billion (equivalent to $ in ) Intermodal Surface Transportation Efficiency Act (ISTEA) that included the I-73/74 North-South Corridor and made I-73 a priority and included an extension of I-74 from Hamilton County to I-73 at Portsmouth.

On August 31, 1992, the Ohio Turnpike Commission passed a resolution to study making the extension of I-74 a toll road. Congress had authorized paying for 80 percent of the cost, but the state would have to pay the remainder of the $56 million (equivalent to $ in ).

The Ohio Turnpike Commission proposed that the extension run along SR 32; while Representative Jim Bunning of Kentucky wanted the road to begin in the west as part of a greater Cincinnati/Northern Kentucky bypass, returning to Ohio near Maysville, Kentucky.

West Virginia 

, I-74 remains unbuilt in the state of West Virginia. The West Virginia Department of Transportation (WVDOT) is currently upgrading the Tolsia Highway to four lanes but not to Interstate Highway standards.

It was estimated that improving US 52 to Interstate standards in West Virginia would cost $2 billion (equivalent to $ in ). Still, by 1994, improvements to US 52 were planned, and future plans called for I-73 to follow that route. The I-74 extension seemed more certain.

North Carolina 

Two sections of I-74 in North Carolina are currently under construction. These include building the bypass of Rockingham with I-73 and the eastern half of the Winston-Salem Northern Beltway.

The proposed path of I-74 east of I-95 in North Carolina is still being debated. The current plan takes the route along US 74 to NC 211 near Bolton then south along US 17 to near the South Carolina border. These sections are not currently proposed to be built perhaps for another 20 to 30 years. The North Carolina Turnpike Authority—at the request of officials in Brunswick County—are studying whether a toll road could get the section of I-74 in that county built faster.

Starting around Laurinburg and Maxton and to the east, I-74 runs concurrent with US 74. This was the first time that a U.S. Route and Interstate Highway with the same number have been designated on the same highway. A similar situation occurred more recently in June 2015 when Wisconsin started routing I-41 along the route of US 41.

South Carolina

On February 11, 2005, the North Carolina Department of Transportation (NCDOT) and South Carolina Department of Transportation (SCDOT) came to an agreement over where I-74 (and I-73) would cross the border between the two states. It was decided that I-74 would cross the line as a northern extension of South Carolina Highway 31 (SC 31). I-74 is then proposed to end south of Myrtle Beach at SC 707. At one time, both I-73 and I-74 were to end at Georgetown. In November 2019, both NCDOT and SCDOT released maps of where I-74 could go to from South Carolina to North Carolina.

Junction list
Iowa
  in Davenport
  on the Davenport–Bettendorf city line. The highways travel concurrently to Moline, Illinois.
  in Bettendorf
Illinois
  in Moline. I-74/I-280 travels concurrently to Colona.
  in Colona
  in Galesburg
  east of Knoxville
  west of Peoria
  in Peoria
  in East Peoria
  in East Peoria
  in Morton
  north-northwest of Yuton
  northwest of Normal. I-55/I-74 travels concurrently to Bloomington. I-74/US 51 travels concurrently to south of Bloomington.
  in Bloomington
  south-southeast of Le Roy
  in Champaign
  in Urbana
  east-northeast of Oakwood
  in Tilton
Indiana
  in Veedersburg
  in Crawfordsville
  on the Indianapolis–Speedway line. I-74/I-465 travels concurrently into Indianapolis proper.
  in Indianapolis. The highways travel concurrently through Indianapolis.
  in Indianapolis. The highways travel concurrently through Indianapolis.
  in Indianapolis
  in Indianapolis. I-69/I-74 travel concurrently until I-74 leaves I-465. I-69 is not yet signed along I-465 in Indianapolis, nor is this new south junction with I-465 & I-74 yet under construction.
  in Indianapolis. The highways travel concurrently through Indianapolis.
  in Indianapolis
  in Indianapolis. I-74/US 421 travels concurrently to northwest of Greensburg. I-69 is not yet signed along I-465 in Indianapolis.
  west-northwest of West Harrison. The highways travel concurrently to Cincinnati, Ohio.
Ohio
  west-northwest of Miamitown. The highways travel concurrently to northwest of Dent.
  in Cincinnati
  in Cincinnati
  in Cincinnati
 Gap in route
North Carolina
  at the Virginia state line north-northwest of Pine Ridge. The highways travel concurrently to west-southwest of Pine Ridge.
  in White Plains
  east of White Plains
 Gap in route
  in Winston-Salem
  in High Point
  east-northeast of Archdale
  in Randleman. I-73/I-74 travels concurrently to south-southwest of Ellerbe. I-74/US 220 travels concurrently to Emery.
  south-southwest of Ellerbe
 Gap in route
  southeast of Maxton. I-74/US 74 travels concurrently to Lumberton.
  west-southwest of Lumberton
  in Lumberton
 Gap in route

Auxiliary routes
: A bypass of Winston-Salem, North Carolina, planned to follow the western half of the Winston-Salem Northern Beltway.
: A southwestern bypass loop of Peoria, Illinois.

See also

References

External links

I-74 in NC Progress Page
SCDOT - Carolina Bays Parkway Phase II (part of I-74)
High Priority Corridor 5 (I-73/74) 
Upgrade 74 Renovation Project 
I-74 on Cincinnati-Transit.net
Interstate 74 Cincinnati to Piketon Corridor
I-74 Iowa-Illinois Corridor Study
Illinois Highway Ends: Interstate 74
Indiana Highway Ends: Interstate 74
AA Roads - Interstate 74
National I-73/74 Corridor Association
Interstate 74 Construction, Moline, Illinois 

 
Interstate Highway System
U.S. Route 52